The 13th Central Committee of the Chinese Communist Party was in session from 1987 to 1992. It held seven plenary sessions. It was preceded by the 12th Central Committee and succeeded by the 14th Central Committee. It elected the 13th Politburo of the Chinese Communist Party in 1987.

List of members
In stroke order of surnames:

Chronology
1st Plenary Session
Date: November 2, 1987
Location: Beijing
Significance: Zhao Ziyang was elected General Secretary. 18-member Politburo, 5-member Politburo Standing Committee and 5-member Secretariat were elected. Deng Xiaoping was re-elected Chairman of the Central Military Commission, and Chen Yun replaced him as Chairman of the Central Advisory Commission. Jiang Zemin was elected to the Politburo for the first time.
2nd Plenary Session
Date: March 15–19, 1988
Location: Beijing
Significance: List of candidates for top State posts to be submitted to the 7th National People's Congress and the 7th National Committee of the Chinese People's Political Consultative Conference were adopted.
3rd Plenary Session
Date: September 26–30, 1988
Location: Beijing
Significance: A program on the reform of prices and wages was taken, urging the State Council to put inflation under strict control.
4th Plenary Session
Date: June 23–24, 1989
Location: Beijing
Significance: The meeting was held after the suppression of the Tian'anmen Square protests. Li Peng delivered a report strongly criticizing Zhao Ziyang for his attitude during the "anti-party, anti-socialist turmoil": he was accused of "passive attitude toward the Four Cardinal Principles" and the "oppose bourgeois liberalization policy", and neglecting "party building, the spiritual civilization construction and ideological and political work". He was thus removed from his capacities of General Secretary, Politburo Standing Committee member, Politburo member and Central Military Commission first vice-chairman, with Jiang Zemin filling his posts as General Secretary and Politburo Standing Committee member.
5th Plenary Session
Date: November 6–9, 1989
Location: Beijing
Significance: Deng Xiaoping resigned as Chairman of the Central Military Commission, and Jiang Zemin took over the post. Yang Shangkun was appointed CMC first vice-chairman.
6th Plenary Session
Date: March 9–12, 1990
Location: Beijing
Significance: In the official communique, the economic reform was exalted, but the growth of "bureaucracy, subjectivism, formalisticism, passivity and corruption" was denounced as well. 
7th Plenary Session
Date: December 25–30, 1990
Location: Beijing
Significance: A decision on the "Program of the National Economy and Society Development Decade" and guidelines for the 8th Five-Year Plan were adopted.
8th Plenary Session
Date: November 25–29, 1991
Location: Beijing
Significance: A decision to enforce family household management of land was taken, in order to secure a bigger output of grain production.
9th Plenary Session
Date: October 5–9, 1992
Location: Beijing
Significance: Preparations for the Party's 14th National Congress were made. The critical assessment on Zhao Ziyang remained unchanged and so he was not listed as a candidate for the 14th Central Committee.

External links
 13th Central Committee of the CCP, People's Daily Online.

Central Committee of the Chinese Communist Party
1987 establishments in China
1992 disestablishments in China